Blasius von Schemua (Klagenfurt, 2 January 1856 – Klagenfurt, 21 November 1920) was an Austro-Hungarian general of Slovene descent.

He graduated from the Theresian Military Academy in Wiener Neustadt in 1874 and the Military High School in Vienna in 1884, where he was also a lecturer from 1893 to 1897.

From 1879, Schemua was a member of the Austro-Hungarian military mission in Persia for three years, during which period he gained a deep appreciation of Islam. In the eyes of his colleagues, his Persian experience permanently marked his character. He was a Darwinist and a member of the occultist New Templar Order of Lanz von Liebenfels. His Templar name was Fra Gotthard.

In 1910, Schemua was responsible for nationwide mobilization in the Ministry of War. From 1911 to 1912 he was Chief of the Austro-Hungarian General Staff, the highest position in the hierarchy of the Austro-Hungarian Army. At the beginning of the Balkan Wars of 1912–13 he was appointed commander of the 16th Corps in Dubrovnik and promoted to Feldmarschalleutnant (lieutenant field marshal). In 1913 he was promoted to general of the infantry. At the beginning of World War I in 1914, during the Battle of Galicia, he commanded the 2nd Corps, but failed to distinguish himself at the Battle of Komarów. He was then appointed commander of the defense of Danube from Krems to Pressburg. In 1915 he retired at his own request.

References 
 

1856 births
1920 deaths
Military personnel from Klagenfurt
Austro-Hungarian generals
Austrian people of Slovenian descent
Austro-Hungarian military personnel of World War I
Theresian Military Academy alumni